Nacy or NACY may refer to:

 Carol A. Nacy (born 1948), microbiologist and immunologist
 Richard R. Nacy (1895–1961), American politician
 Vegas Nacy, a member of the American rock band The Clay People
 NACY, ship radio callsign of USS Freedom (IX-43), a schooner